Kool FM or Kool Radio, may refer to:

Asia-Oceania
 Buletin FM, a talk and adult contemporary station in Malaysia which is previously known as Kool FM

Australia
 Kool FM (Innisfail), contemporary hits radio in Queensland, Australia

Europe
 Kool London, also known as Kool FM, a drum and bass radio station in London, England

North America

Canada
 CKMB-FM, known as 107.5 Kool FM, a hot adult contemporary format radio station in Barrie, Ontario
 CJEG-FM, known as Kool FM 101.3, a hot adult contemporary format radio station in Alberta, Canada

United States
 KOOL-FM, a classic hits radio station based in Phoenix, Arizona, United States
 KNGS-LP, known as Kool FM 104.5 based in Hanford, California, United States
 WSKP (AM), known as Kool Radio based in Rhode Island, United States
WZWK-LP, along with its translator W299BO in Greenville, SC, United States